Oswaldo de Rivero (born 2 August 1936) is Peruvian diplomat serving as the Ambassador to the United States. He served as Permanent Representative of Peru to the United Nations in New York City, and had previously held the post as Peru's ambassador to the World Trade Organization. Previously in his career, he held posts in London and Moscow, and Geneva. He studied law at the Universidad Católica in Lima and later earned a master's degree in international relations from Peru's Academia Diplomática. He carried out Postgraduate studies at the Graduate Institute of International Studies, Geneva. He has authored books on international development, which have been translated into several languages.

Family
He is married to Vivian Pliner de Rivero and has three daughters, Juliett Sophia, Katherina Blanca, and Blanca Maria de Rivero.

Career
1974 to 1978: Secretary-General to the President of the Republic.
1986 to 1993: Head of the Peruvian delegation to the Uruguay Round negotiations.
1986: President of the Economic Commission at the Summit of Non-Aligned Countries (Harare).
1989 to 1992: Head of the Peruvian delegation to the United Nations Commission on Human Rights.
1990: President of the fourth Non-Proliferation Treaty Review Conference (Geneva).
1991: President of the Group of 77 developing countries (Geneva).
xxxx to xxxx: Ambassador to the World Trade Organization.
2001 to 2006: Permanent Representative to the United Nations in New York.
2021 to present: 'Ambassador to the United States.

Publications
New Economic Order and International Development Law. 1980, Oxford: Pergamon Press, 
The Myth of Development: The Non-Viable Economies of the 21st Century. 2001, Zed Books, . Second Edition: 2010, Zed Books, . (also in French, Portuguese, Arabic, Japanese, Spanish and Turkish)
Los Estados Inviables: No-Desarrollo y Supervivencia En El Siglo XXI. 2010, Catarata, 
El pensamiento cero
 La isla de Príapo (Spanish). 2013, Atmosfera Literaria,

References

1936 births
Living people
Graduate Institute of International and Development Studies alumni
Peruvian diplomats
Permanent Representatives of Peru to the United Nations
Permanent Representatives to the World Trade Organization
Ambassadors of Peru to the United States
Place of birth missing (living people)